Russell is an unincorporated community located in Lauderdale County, Mississippi. A post office operated under the name Russell from 1867 to 1976.

References

Unincorporated communities in Lauderdale County, Mississippi
Unincorporated communities in Mississippi
Unincorporated communities in Meridian micropolitan area